Rudolf Galin (1 April 1928 – 8 August 2004) was a Croatian athlete. He competed in the men's hammer throw at the 1952 Summer Olympics.

References

1928 births
2004 deaths
Athletes (track and field) at the 1952 Summer Olympics
Croatian male hammer throwers
Olympic athletes of Yugoslavia
Sportspeople from Zagreb
Mediterranean Games bronze medalists for Yugoslavia
Mediterranean Games medalists in athletics
Athletes (track and field) at the 1951 Mediterranean Games